The Canadian Professional Sales Association, commonly known as CPSA, is a Canadian association for sales professionals. CPSA is a not-for-profit association with over 15,000 members. CPSA offers professional sales designations, sales training and a membership cost-savings program.

History
The Canadian Professional Sales Association was established in 1874 as the Commercial Travellers Association (CTA). The association's mission was stated as the "moral, intellectual, and financial improvement and advancement and welfare of its members."

The founding members were business leaders including first president Warring Kennedy who went on to be the mayor of Toronto in the mid-1890s.

Travel benefits and insurance programs were the driving forces behind membership. And the influence of the founding members attracted Prime Ministers and Cabinet members to the annual "networking" events, the Travellers' Dinners and Banquets. As for travel benefits, commercial rates were extended by the railway hotels,  members received 2 cents off per mile and free sample trunk privileges from the railways and by the 1940s discounts were extended on air travel on Trans-Canada Air Lines or CP Air.

There was tremendous growth in the six regional Travellers Associations until the late 1950s when the air discounts were eliminated. Major membership declines were experienced by all associations and led to the merger of three [CTA, "Ontario" CTA and "Dominion" CTA] of the six. A national organization formed under the CTA name, with 20,000 combined members, $20,000,000 in financial resources and a staff of 8-10.

Between 1988 and 1989, the CTA underwent major organizational changes. The association reorganized its internal structure to focus on four major pillars; education (now referred to as training and professional development), communications, member cost-savings benefits, and information services (now known as the Learning Hub). After restructuring, CTA re-evaluated its public image and changed its name to the Canadian Professional Sales Association.

The Professional Development Department was charged with educating members through workshops, classes, publications and seminars; membership savings increased and improved member benefits; the communications department concentrated on developing public recognition and awareness of CPSA; the Sales Resource Centre was responsible for being a source for Canadian sales and sales management information.

Professional Development
CPSA provides Professional Development (training) courses to sales professionals. The Professional Development Department is charged with organizing, promoting, and executing all in-class and online training, workshops, webinars, and educational events.

CPSA Sales Institute and Sales Certification
The Sales Institute was established by CPSA to enhance the credibility of the sales profession by setting professional standards and sales certification.

The CPSA Sales Institute is the administrator of the Certified Sales Associate (CSA), Certified Sales Professional (CSP) and Certified Sales Leader (CSL) designations which recognize sales professionals for their selling skills and commitment to ethical standards.

Learning Hub
The Learning Hub is a source for Canadian sales and sales management information. Sales Professionals are encouraged to use the Learning Hub to increase performance and productivity.

Through the Learning Hub sales professionals can access articles, book summaries, podcasts, videos, whitepapers, polls, templates and best practices from sales authorities to improve sales and management performance.

Membership Savings
CPSA members receive discounts in four categories: travel, insurance, business and lifestyle. The association uses buying power to acquire savings for members.

Travel Savings
CPSA has a program that gives members access to preferred rates on Hotels, Car Rental, Airport Parking, Rail travel and Travel Insurance.

Insurance Savings
CPSA is partnered with four insurance providers who provide insurance in travel, home, auto and business, term life, health, dental, and disability and pet insurance.

Business Savings
CPSA business savings partners offer preferred rates on computers and home office tech, cloud-based communications, business supplies, fleet management and shipping.

Lifestyle Savings
CPSA lifestyle savings include discounts on fitness memberships and gear, retail goods, entertainment and food services.

References

External links
 Canadian Professional Sales Association
 Earliest known cpsa website from 1998
 Sales Training Centre

Professional associations based in Canada
Service companies of Canada
1874 establishments in Ontario
Sales professional associations